His Best is a greatest hits album by American blues musician Howlin' Wolf. The album was originally released on April 8, 1997 by MCA/Chess Records, and was one of a series of releases by MCA for the 50th anniversary of Chess Records that year (see 1997 in music). Ten years later – on April 17, 2007 – the album was reissued by Geffen Records as The Definitive Collection.

The album features several of his most well-known recording including "Smokestack Lightnin', "Spoonful", and "Killing Floor".

Recording and production 
The first two songs on the collection – "Moanin' at Midnight" and "How Many More Years" – were recorded at Memphis Recording Service on either May 14, or August 1951 and were produced by Sam Phillips, who would later produce Elvis Presley and Johnny Cash. The rest of the songs on the album were recorded in Chicago, Illinois from May 1954 to August 1964. The original recordings were produced by either the Chess brothers – Leonard and Phil – and/or Willie Dixon, who recorded numerous artists for Chess Records. The reissue production was handled by Andy McKaie with digital remastering by Erick Labson.

Artwork, packaging 
The album's art director was Vartan, the album was designed by Mike Fink. The photographs for the album were credited to Brian Smith, Joseph Sia, Frank Driggs, Ray Flerlage, Peter Amft, John Gibbs Rockwood, and the Universal Music Archives. The liner notes for the album were written by Mark Humphrey.

Track listing

Personnel 

Howlin' Wolf – vocals, harmonica, guitar
Willie Johnson – guitar
Willie Steele – drums on "Moanin' at Midnight" and "How Many More Years"
Ike Turner – piano on "How Many More Years"
Albert Williams – piano on "How Many More Years"
Sam Phillips – production on "Moanin' at Midnight" and "How Many More Years"
Otis Spann – piano
Jody Williams – guitar on "Evil (Is Going On)" and "Forty-Four"
Hubert Sumlin – guitar
Willie Dixon – vocals on "Goin' Down Slow", bass, production
Earl Phillips – drums
Hosea Lee Kennard – piano
Otis "Smokey" Smothers – guitar on "I Asked for Water" and "Who's Been Talkin'"
Adolph "Billy" Duncan – tenor saxophone on "Who's Been Talkin'"
Alfred Elkins – bass on "Who's Been Talkin'" and "Sitting on Top of the World"
Andrew "Blueblood" McMahon – bass on "Killing Floor"
Abb Locke – tenor saxophone on "Howlin' for My Darlin'"
S. P. Leary – drums on "Howlin' for My Darlin'"
Abe Smothers – guitar on "Howlin' for My Darlin'"
Freddy King – guitar
Freddie Robinson – guitar
Fred Below – drums
Johnny Jones – piano on "Shake for Me" and "The Red Rooster"
Jimmy Rogers – guitar
Henry Gray – piano on "I Ain't Superstitious" and "Goin' Down Slow"
Sam Lay – drums
J. T. Brown – tenor saxophone
Donald Hankins – baritone saxophone
Lafayette Leake – piano
Buddy Guy – bass guitar, guitar on "Killing Floor"
Leonard Chess – production
Phil Chess – production
Andy McKaie – reissue production, compilation
Erick Labson – digital remastering

References

External links 

His Best at Yahoo! Music

Howlin' Wolf albums
1997 compilation albums
2007 compilation albums
MCA Records compilation albums
Chess Records compilation albums
Geffen Records compilation albums
Albums recorded at Sun Studio
Albums produced by Sam Phillips